Ruslan Suanov may refer to:

 Ruslan Suanov (footballer, born 1975), Russian football player
 Ruslan Suanov (footballer, born 1997), Russian football player